Charles Norris (C N) Williamson (1859–1920) was a British writer, motoring journalist and founder of the Black and White who was perhaps best known for his collaboration with his wife, Alice Muriel Williamson, in a number of novels and travelogues.

Biography
Born in Exeter, Williamson was educated at University College, London, where he studied engineering.  He spent eight years as a journalist on the Graphic before establishing the Black and White in 1891 as founding editor.  He published a Life of Carlyle in 1881.  Several of the Williamsons' short stories and novels later became films.

Charles Norris Williamson wrote many of his published works in partnership with his wife, Alice who he married in 1894; she apparently said of him "Charlie Williamson could do anything in the world except write stories": she also said "I can't do anything else."  Charles wrote some novels on his own, as did Alice after her husband's death

He died at Combe Down, Bath, on Sunday 3 October 1920.

Works

Edited by C N Williamson and R H Shepherd

Memoirs of Carlyle with personal Reminiscences and Selections from his private Letters. 2 vols. 1881.

Authored by C N & A M Williamson

The Eccentricity of Fleetwood, The Strand Magazine (US) Aug 1901
The Lightning Conductor (1902)
The Princess Passes, Metropolitan Magazine (New York) Oct, Nov 1904
Lady Betty Crosses the Ocean, Ladies' Home Journal Oct 1905
My Friend the Chauffeur (1905)
Lady Betty Across the Water (1906)
Lady Betty Runs Away, Ladies' Home Journal Jan 1906
The Chauffeur and the Chaperon, The Delineator Oct 1906
A Real English Christmas with Lady Betty, Ladies Home Journal Dec 1906
The Princess Virginia, Ladies' Home Journal Oct, Dec 1906, Jan 1907
The Botor Chaperon, The Grand Magazine Aug, Sep, Oct, Nov, Dec 1906, Jan 1907
The Car of Destiny (1907)
Scarlet Runner (1908) - serialised in the Strand Magazine December 1906 to November 1907
Set in Silver (1909)
The Motor Maid (1910)
The Golden Silence (1910)
Flower Forbidden [Part 1], Smith's Magazine Apr 1911
The Heather Moon (1912)
Champion: The Story of a Motor Car (1913)
The Love Pirate (1913)
The Port of Adventure (1913)
The Shop-Girl, Munsey's Magazine Jul 1914
It Happened in Egypt (1914)
The Love Trees, Munsey's Magazine, Dec 1915
This Woman to This Man, All-Story Weekly Apr 29, 13 May 1916
The War Wedding (1916)
The Lightning Conductress (1916)
The Shop-Girl (1916)
The Lion's Mouse, Munsey's Magazine, Feb, Mar, Apr, May, Jun, Jul, Aug 1918
The Second Latchkey (1920)S
Berry Goes to Monte Carlo (1921)
The Great Pearl Secret (1921)

For an unknown period, but certainly in the 1890s he edited (or "conducted") a 1 penny fortnightly periodical entitled "The Minute, illustrated" A sort of Reader's Digest of contemporary Victorian society. Supported by much advertising.

Filmography
The Lightning Conductor (1914)
Lord John in New York (1915)
The Grey Sisterhood (1916, short)
Lord Loveland Discovers America (1916)
Three Fingered Jenny (1916, short)
The Eye of Horus (1916, short)
The League of the Future (1916, short)
 (1916)
The Scarlet Runner (1916, serial)
The Demon (1918)
 (1920, serial)
Passion's Playground (1920)
My Lady's Latchkey (1921)
The Lion's Mouse (UK, 1923)
My Friend the Chauffeur (Germany, 1926)
The Man Without a Face (1928, serial)
Yūrei tō (Japan, 1948)

References

External links

 
 
 

1859 births
1920 deaths
British motoring journalists
Alumni of University College London